Kolesnikovka is a rural locality (a selo) in Zaytsevskoye Rural Settlement, Kantemirovsky  District, Voronezh Oblast, Russia. The population was 55 as of 2010.

Geography
Kolesnikovka is located 28 km southeast of Kantemirovka (the district's administrative centre) by road. Garmashevka is the nearest rural locality.

References 

Rural localities in Kantemirovsky District